Kestelman is a surname. Notable people with the surname include: 

Larry Kestelman (born 1966), Australian billionaire
Morris Kestelman (1905–1998), British artist and teacher
Sara Kestelman (born 1944), English actress

See also
Kesselman